Miles Taylor (July 16, 1805 – September 23, 1873) was a member of the U.S. House of Representatives representing the state of Louisiana.  He served three terms as a Democrat. On February 5, 1861, shortly after Louisiana seceded from the Union, Taylor resigned his seat in Congress, announcing that "the whole South would rise up to a man to resist" efforts by the Federal government to control slavery.

Taylor was born in Saratoga Springs, New York. He served in Congress from 1855, until Louisiana's secession from the Union. He died in Saratoga Springs, New York, and was buried in the family graveyard at his plantation, Front Scattery, near Belle Alliance, Louisiana. Scattery Plantation was sold in parcels and there does not seem to be any cemetery there now.

Personal life
On May 21, 1838, he married Eliza Ann Bruden, age 19 of Mississippi at Terrebonne Parish, Louisiana. She died in 1850. They had four children:
John (b. 1839)
Mary (Taylor) May (living 1891 as a widow in New Orleans}
Thomas (c. 1843 – October 11, 1907, Cassanova Virginia) who served in 8th Louisiana Regiment CSA);
Searing (c. 1845 – February 25, 1891, Saint Emma Plantation, age 45) who served as a "special agent" for the Confederate Government.

Notes

External links

Political Graveyard
Miles Taylor photograph at Find A Grave

1805 births
1873 deaths
Democratic Party members of the United States House of Representatives from Louisiana
19th-century American politicians